The Albion press is a model of early iron hand printing press, originally designed and manufactured in London by Richard Whittaker Cope (d. 1828?) around 1820.

History 
The Albion press worked by a simple toggle action, unlike the complex lever-mechanism of the Columbian press and the Stanhope press. Albions continued to be manufactured, in a range of sizes, until the 1930s. They were used for commercial book-printing until the middle of the nineteenth century, and thereafter chiefly for proofing, jobbing work and by private presses.

Francis Meynell often used an Albion to proof pages of his designs for Nonesuch Press books, and printed some small books and ephemera using the press. Printers still predominantly using an Albion Press in the United Kingdom to publish limited fine press editions include Ian Mortimer's I.M. Imprimit, and the St James Park Press of James Freemantle.

After Cope's death, Albions were manufactured by his heirs and members of the Hopkinson family (trading initially as 'Jonathan and Jeremiah Barrett' and later as 'Hopkinson and Cope'), who are said to have improved the design. From the 1850s onwards Albion presses were manufactured under licence by other firms, notably Harrild & Sons, Miller and Richard, and Frederick Ullmer Ltd. The toggle-action, and the distinctive shape and 'crown' finial of the Albion, make it instantly recognizable.

References

Stone, Reynolds. The Albion press. London: Printing Historical Society, lc104173786
Photos of Albion Press in McCune Collection

Letterpress printing